Tilen Žitnik (born 2 July 1991) is a Slovenian tennis player.

Žitnik has a career high ATP singles ranking of 1490 achieved on 6 January 2014. He also has a career high ATP doubles ranking of 1033 achieved on 24 October 2011.

Žitnik represents Slovenia at the Davis Cup where he has a W/L record of 0–2.

External links
 
 
 

1991 births
Living people
Slovenian male tennis players